The Unidad Deportiva Benito Juárez is a multi-use stadium in Nuevo Laredo.  It is currently used mostly for football matches and is the home stadium for Bravos de Nuevo Laredo  The stadium has a capacity of 5,000 people.

References

External links

Football venues in Mexico
Athletics (track and field) venues in Mexico
Sports venues in Tamaulipas